High on You may refer to:
 High on You (Sly Stone album)
 High on You (Jeangu Macrooy album)
 "High on You" (Sigma and John Newman song)
 "High on You" (Survivor song)